Florenville (Gaumais: Floravile) is a city and municipality of Wallonia located in the province of Luxembourg, Belgium. 

On 1 January 2016 the municipality had 5,639 inhabitants. The total area is 146.91 km², giving a population density of 38.38 inhabitants per km².

It is located on the Semois River, facing the French border.

The municipality consists of the following districts: Chassepierre, Florenville, Fontenoille, Lacuisine, Muno, Sainte-Cécile, and Villers-devant-Orval. 

Other population centers include: Azy, Conques, Laiche, Martué, Lambermont, Le Ménil, and Watrinsart.

Orval Abbey is located in Villers-devant-Orval.

See also
 List of protected heritage sites in Florenville

References
Union des Villes et Communes Wallones 
SPF Economy

External links
 
Florenville official website 

 
Cities in Wallonia
Municipalities of Luxembourg (Belgium)